The Women's high jump at the 1952 Olympic Games took place on 27 July at the Helsinki Olympic Stadium. South African athlete Esther Brand won the gold medal.

Records
Prior to this competition, the existing world and Olympic records were as follows.

No new records were set during this competition.

Results
Competition consisted of a final round with all 17 contestants.

References

External links
Official Olympic Report, la84.org.

Athletics at the 1952 Summer Olympics
High jump at the Olympics
1952 in women's athletics
Women's events at the 1952 Summer Olympics